Roberto Altamirano Sánchez (born November 25, 1944) is a Mexico sprint canoer. Active in the early to mid-1970s, he competed in two Summer Olympics, earning his best finish of eighth in the C-1 1000 m event at Munich in 1972.

References
Sports-reference.com profile

1944 births
Canoeists at the 1972 Summer Olympics
Canoeists at the 1976 Summer Olympics
Living people
Mexican male canoeists
Olympic canoeists of Mexico